Stigmella maoriella is a species of moth in the family Nepticulidae. It is endemic to New Zealand. It is classified as Not Threatened by the Department of Conservation.

Taxonomy 
This species was described by Francis Walker in 1864 and named Tinea maoriella using a specimen collected by Lt Col Daniel Bolton, RE. In 1988 John S. Dugdale assigned the species to the genus Stigmella. The lectotype specimen is held at the Natural History Museum, London.

Description 
Walker described the species as follows:

Distribution 
This species is endemic to New Zealand. It is found from Auckland to Hawke's Bay.

It can be differentiated from its close relatives S. ogygia and S. hakekeae as S. maoriella lacks the large cornutus on the aedeagus of the male of the species. S. maoriella is also larger than S. ilsea.

Habitat and host species 
The larvae of this species feed on Olearia species.

Conservation Status 
This species has been classified as being "Not Threatened" under the New Zealand Threat Classification System.

References

Nepticulidae
Moths of New Zealand
Moths described in 1864
Endemic fauna of New Zealand
Taxa named by Francis Walker (entomologist)
Endemic moths of New Zealand